Red-bellied pacu can refer to the following species of fish of the subfamily Serrasalminae:

Colossoma macropomum or tambaqui
Piaractus brachypomus or pirapitinga